The list gives the composition of the governments of the Republic of Lithuania from 1990 as of 15 December 2016. Government of the Republic of Lithuania is the cabinet of Lithuania, proposed by the President and confirmed by the Seimas (parliament).

In 1990 Lithuania declared independence from the Soviet Union. Since then Lithuania has been a democratic republic. All citizens elect the Seimas for a four-year term. The most recent elections took place in October 2016.

Governments

See also
  List of governments of Lithuania (1918–1940)

Notes

References
 
 
 

Lithuania
Legal history of Lithuania
Governments